The National Museum of the Philippines is an umbrella government organization that oversees a number of national museums in the Philippines including ethnographic, anthropological, archaeological, and visual arts collections. From 1973 until 2021, the National Museum served as the regulatory and enforcement agency of the government of the Philippines in the restoring and safeguarding of significant cultural properties, sites, and reservations throughout the Philippines. The mandate has since been transferred to the National Commission for Culture and the Arts.

The National Museum operates the National Museum of Fine Arts, National Museum of Anthropology, and the National Museum of Natural History, all located in the National Museum Complex in Manila. The institution also operates branch museums throughout the country.

The National Museum also established and operates regional museums across the Philippines: National Museum Eastern-Northern Mindanao (Butuan), National Museum Central Visayas Regional Museum (Cebu City), National Museum Western Visayas (Iloilo City), National Museum Western-Southern Mindanao (Zamboanga City), and National Museum Ilocos (Vigan City), to name a few.

History

Spanish era
The first predecessor to the current National Museum of the Philippines organization was the Museo-Biblioteca de Filipinas which was established by royal decree by the Spanish colonial government in the Philippines on August 12, 1887. Its first museum-library opened at the Casa de la Moneda along Cabildo Street on October 24, 1891. It later moved to a building along Gunao Street in Quiapo before it became defunct sometime around the onset of the American occupation of the Philippines in 1900.

American era
The American-supervised Philippine Commission established the Insular Museum of Ethnology, Natural History, and Commerce under the Department of Public Instruction on October 29, 1901 through Act No. 284 to replace the museum-library. The Insular Museum was founded to complement the Bureau of Non-Christian Tribes which was later renamed as the Bureau of Ethnological Survey. After the Louisiana Purchase Exposition of 1904, the Insular Museum was renamed as the Philippine Museum. The Bureau of Ethnological Survey was abolished as a separate bureau and was reorganized as the Division of Ethnology under the Bureau of Education in 1905. It was subsequently moved to the Bureau of Science in 1906.

In 1916, the organization of the Philippine Museum underwent another overhaul. Through Act No. 2572, the Philippine Library and Museum was created through the merger of the Division of Ethnology and the Fine Arts Division of the Philippine Museum. The Philippine Museum's Natural History Division was retained under the Bureau of Science.

The National Museum of the Philippine Islands would be established on December 7, 1928 through Act No. 3477. It was placed under the Department of Agriculture and Natural Resources. It was abolished in 1933 by Act No. 4007. The Division of Fine Arts was placed under the Philippine Library and Museum (now National Library of the Philippines) while the Division of Ethnology was placed under the Bureau of Science. The National Museum Division was created from the merger of the Division of Ethnology and the Natural History Division. The National Museum Division was renamed as the National History Museum Division with the Office of the Secretary of Agriculture and Commerce named as its parent agency via Commonwealth Act No. 453 in 1939. The Division was later merged to the National Library's Division of Fine Arts to become the National Museum under the Office of the Executive Secretary.

World War II
The Japanese occupation of the Philippines during World War II brought the Natural History Museum Division and the National Library's Fine Arts Division back under a single organization, but the museum lost a large part of its collection during the Liberation of Manila of 1945 when the Old Legislative Building and the Bureau of Science Building was destroyed. The organization which resulted from the divisions' merger was named as the National Museum and was placed under the Office of the Executive Secretary. The Legislative Building would be restored.

Contemporary era

The museum's role in cultural growth was recognized as contributing to government's desire for national development. In 1966, President Ferdinand Marcos signed Republic Act No. 4846 or the Cultural Properties and Protection Act. The law designated the museum as the lead agency in the protection and preservation of the nation's cultural properties through the conduct of census, study, and declaration of such properties and the monitoring and regulation of archaeological exploration, excavation, or diggings in historical or archaeological sites. With its new powers, it was able to strengthen its cultural mandate by declaring properties, structures, and sites of historical and cultural value to the nation. The educational mandate was strengthened because it was able to inform the public of the research it conducted and through the acquisition and exhibition of archaeological finds.

In 2019, the powers of the National Museum were further expanded through Republic Act No. 11333 which was signed into law by President Rodrigo Duterte. Under the law the museum body's official name was lengthened to National Museum of the Philippines from just being National Museum. It was also classified as a government trust attached to the government for only budgetary reasons preserving a degree of independence and autonomy. It is also mandated to establish regional museums in each of the country's administrative regions.

Museums

Central museums

The National Museum Complex consist of the central museums of the National Museum of the Philippines. These are the National Museum of Fine Arts, the National Museum of Anthropology, and the National Museum of Natural History. The National Planetarium was also part of this complex.

Satellite museums

The National Museum has also established numerous satellite museums outside Metro Manila.

Regional museums

Area museums

Site museums

Former facilities

Museums
The National Museum had a satellite museum in Bolinao, Pangasinan. It was an archeological museum featuring historic objects retrieved from the different parts of the province. It first opened in 1970.

National Planetarium

The Planetarium was planned in 1970's by former National Museum Director Godofredo Alcasid Sr. with the assistance of Mr. Maximo P. Sacro Jr. of the Philippine Weather bureau and one of the founders of the Philippine Astronomical Society.

The building started on construction on 1974 and completed 9 months after. It was formally inaugurated on October 8, 1975. The Presidential Decree No. 804-A, issued on September 30, 1975, affirmed the Planetarium's status. The Planetarium is located between the Japanese Garden and the Chinese Garden at the Rizal Park.

Seminars and lectures
The National Museum offers numerous lectures, workshops, and seminars annually. However, most of these events happen at the museums within Metro Manila. More than 80% of provinces in the country have yet to possess a museum under the authority of the National Museum. A partial reason for this lacking is the non-existence of a Department of Culture. In late 2016, a bill establishing the Department of Culture and the Arts and another bill strengthening the National Museum, including its regional museums, were filed by Senator Loren Legarda in the Senate. Both bills were formally introduced in early 2017.

References

Further reading

External links

 

 
Philippines
Government agencies under the Office of the President of the Philippines
Government agencies established in 1901
1901 establishments in the Philippines
Department of Education (Philippines)
Museum organizations